The Battle of Silawathura was fought in 1991 in Silawathura, Sri Lanka. The Sri Lankan military camp at Silawathura was put to siege by the Liberation Tigers of Tamil Eelam (LTTE) for several days before they were repulsed.

References

1991 in Sri Lanka
Battles of Eelam War II
Conflicts in 1991
June 1991 events in Asia